"Fyer Seselwa" was the national anthem of Seychelles from 1978 to 1996 after France-Albert René's coup, replacing En Avant as the national anthem. The lyrics were made collectively while the melody was made by Pierre Dastros-Géze.

Lyrics

References

External links 
 https://www.youtube.com/watch?v=3951fXL-kNY - Instrumental from Kingworld30
 https://www.youtube.com/watch?v=0PPxgRfwuUQ - Vocal from Anthem Base

African anthems
Seychellois music
National symbols of Seychelles